Georges Arthur Dillon-Kavanagh du Fertagh (14 February 1873 – 4 August 1944) was a French fencer. He won three medals at the 1906 Intercalated Games.

References

External links
 

1873 births
1944 deaths
French male épée fencers
French male foil fencers
Olympic fencers of France
Olympic gold medalists for France
Olympic silver medalists for France
Medalists at the 1906 Intercalated Games
Fencers at the 1900 Summer Olympics
Fencers at the 1906 Intercalated Games
Sportspeople from Nîmes
Violent deaths in France
20th-century French people